= Lin Lien-hui =

Taiwanese politician

Lin Lien-hui (Chinese: 林聯輝) is a Taiwanese politician.

Lin was a member of the Legislative Yuan from 1981 to 1990, representing Taiwan's fourth district, encompassing Tainan, Chiayi, and Yunlin Counties. Lin contested the 2004 legislative election as an independent candidate from Tainan, though he was not seated.
